Taylor Hall in Hawkinsville, Georgia is a building built in 1825 with Greek Revival and "Plantation Plain" architectural elements.  It was listed on the National Register of Historic Places in 1978.

Taylor Hall is the oldest house in Pulaski County. Dr. Robert Newsom Taylor used Creek Indian labor to construct Taylor Hall in 1824. Originally built on the banks of the Ocmulgee River in old Hartford, the house was dismantled in 1836 and ferried across the river to its present site. Taylor Hall has weathered Yankee encampments, marauding gypsies and period of neglect. Now restored, the house features the original wainscoting and hand-hewn pine planks. It is currently a private residence.  It is down a private drive, with no good view from public property.

References

Houses on the National Register of Historic Places in Georgia (U.S. state)
Houses completed in 1825
Greek Revival houses in Georgia (U.S. state)
Houses in Pulaski County, Georgia
National Register of Historic Places in Pulaski County, Georgia